The Mississippi River Festival (MRF) was a summer outdoor concert series held during the years 1969-1980 on the campus of Southern Illinois University in Edwardsville, Illinois. The Festival was notable due to its central midwestern location, the natural ambience of its outdoor venue, and the consistently high quality of performers.

On May 22, 1981, officials at SIU announced there would be no Mississippi River Festival in the upcoming summer.

MRF consisted of a variety of popular rock, folk, bluegrass, and classical music performers. Shows for the more popular groups, such as The Who, Yes, Chicago, Eagles, and Grateful Dead, were heavily attended. Some shows attracted crowds in excess of 30,000. Jackson Browne appeared as both a backup band (for Yes in 1972 and America in 1973) and ultimately, as a lead act in 1977. He also wrote two of his songs for the live Running on Empty album in a nearby Holiday Inn at the intersection of I-270 and Illinois Route 157. It is estimated that over one million visitors attended MRF over 12 summers.

In July 1969, Bob Dylan did a short surprise gig with The Band. It was his first performance since his notorious motorcycle accident in 1966.

Logistics 
The outdoor venue was located on a hill forming a natural amphitheater characterized by a large circus-like tent, an acoustic shell at the bottom of the hill, and a single entrance area at the top of the hill. Students were able to attend shows at a discount. The MRF site was designed by George Anselevicius and George Dickie. The tent area contained approximately 1,900 director-style chairs arranged on a white gravel rock surface.  Although there were a minimal number of permanent structures at the venue, the entrance, concession stands, and restroom areas were decorated with large canvas sails designed by Gyo Obata. The mini-roadtrip to the site and meeting friends in the parking areas around the venue were akin to a 1970s youth version of tailgating.

The majority of audience sat on the lawn on blankets. Two pathways flanked the lawn area running from the entrance area to the stage area, which provided a permanent pathway for movement and finding a spot in a sea of blankets.  There were restrooms on either side of the venue. For those who attended, there are fond memories of all day outdoor parties with friends and the opportunity to see top concert talent.

In 1978, the Nederlander Organization was contracted to manage the facility and book acts.  In 1980, SIUE officials requested that the Nederlander Organization book more eclectic entertainment, including classical symphonies and operas instead of just popular music bands.  Nederlander refused, and after a breakdown in negotiations, the University decided to close the venue. Since the Nederlander Organization held a ten-year lease, the facility could not be used.

Sound production 
Bob Heil, President and founder of Heil Sound and production adviser to national touring groups (such as the Grateful Dead and The Who), provided sound production for seven years. Ed Drone of Heil Sound mixed the house sound six nights a week for seven years.

Further reading 
Efforts to resurrect this popular event have, unfortunately, been met with challenges mainly due to funding and other limitations of producing such an event in today's environment. The history of the event and an extensive collection of black-and-white photos has been captured in the book The Mississippi River Festival. Additional history and video assembled by Dr. Stephen Kerber is available on a virtual exhibit of MRF located on the Southern Illinois University Edwardsville website.

Southern Illinois University Edwardsville commemorated the 40th anniversary of the first season of the Mississippi River Festival with a picnic and dedication of a plaque at the festival site on June 13, 2009

Artist Steve Hartman commemorated the event in the painting Mississippi River Festival: Shadows at Dusk. The painting was commissioned by the Southern Illinois University Edwardsville Alumni Association as a gift to the former Director of Alumni Services.

See also 

List of historic rock festivals
Walter Susskind

References

External links 
 The MRF in the SIUE Archives

Rock festivals in the United States
Music festivals in Illinois
Pop music festivals in the United States
Southern Illinois University Edwardsville
Edwardsville, Illinois
Music festivals established in 1969